SNCC: The New Abolitionists is a book by Howard Zinn that describes the early years of the Student Nonviolent Coordinating Committee (SNCC) and their registering of voters in the rural south.

Synopsis 
This book describes the SNCC, focusing especially on the early years. Zinn details in particular the voting registration efforts by black activists in the most recalcitrant areas of the South, as well as the federal government's failure to support their efforts. Zinn highlighted the role of civil disobedience as a countermeasure to state repression.

Reception 
Martin Duberman describes this book and its reception in his biography Howard Zinn: A Life on the Left. Duberman notes that Zinn received largely positive reviews at time of publication, and he describes the book as among Zinn's best. Duberman writes that the book is "passionately argued, intense, and persuasive, though it has a few peripheral problems. Duberman critiques the non-chronological structure of the book, which makes it difficult to know which events occur when. In addition, Duberman criticizes Zinn's style of citation, noting that Zinn doesn't always make clear whether he is using remembered quotes or precise quotes from audio tapes.

Writing in a 1974 review of the civil rights history corpus, George Burson Jr. describes Zinn's work as "an excellent history" and as one of the very few books dealing specifically with the SNCC. He notes that the book provides "valuable insights into the SNCC's radicalism."

Writing shortly after publication in the Harvard Crimson, Donald E. Graham, later the chairman of the Washington Post, said that despite the book's quality as an "unbalanced glorification of the SNCC," the book has considerable power and merit. He highlights the book's capacity to help "maintain your sense of urgency of civil rights problems," making concrete the harsh reality of the civil rights protests through Zinn's crafting of narrative and evocative style. Further, Graham says that Zinn's work "stand[s] out" from other accounts because it "presents the unusual philosophy that has been born out of SNCC work," leaving beching the armchair philosophy of other works.

Publishing details 
Beacon Press approached Zinn in 1963, suggesting that he write a scholarly book on the NAACP. Zinn proposed that he instead write about the SNCC from his perspective as a participant. Despite a schedule allowing his little time to write, preoccupied as he was with his teaching and his activism, Zinn finished the book in 1964. He based the book on his own experiences with the SCNCC, including recordings of SNCC volunteers and his own recalled conversations.

References 

1964 non-fiction books
Books by Howard Zinn
Beacon Press books
Books about activism